Otterbein is a small neighborhood of historic rowhouses in Baltimore, Maryland, United States. Otterbein is immediately southwest of, and in close walking distance to, the Inner Harbor. The neighborhood is very compact, entirely located between Hanover Street and Sharp Street, and between Barre Street and Henrietta Street. It is in small parts of zip codes 21201 and 21230. It is named for Old Otterbein Church (Baltimore, Maryland), located immediately north of the neighborhood.

History
The original houses in the neighborhood were constructed in the 1840s and 1850s as single houses or as two-house "developments." The size of the houses, and the social status of their occupants, varied primarily based on their location within a square-block pattern. The largest homes and most affluent residents were located on the primary east-west streets (Barre, Lee, and Hill). These homes were built and lived in by a mixture of business people involved in leadership positions in some of the most important industries of the city, including construction (especially brick-making), shipping, shipbuilding, the Baltimore & Ohio Railroad, and retail sales. Houses on the primary north-south streets (Sharp and Hanover) were smaller but still sizable for the time period. Residents in these homes were involved in many of the same industries as their wealthier neighbors, but usually in less-remunerative skilled or clerk positions. The smallest homes in the neighborhood were built on half-sized lots along the east-west and even north-south "alleys" on the interior of blocks formed by the primary streets (Welcome Alley, York Street, Comb Alley, Peach Alley). These homes were largely occupied by unskilled manual laborers or low-skill craftspeople, including cordwainers (cobblers), draymen, carters, factory workers, and construction laborers. In addition to the mix of social class and house size within a particular block, house size and social class also went slightly from higher to lower along a northeast to southwest gradient (richest people and largest homes to the north and east, diminishing in the southern and western parts of the neighborhood). In addition to this diversity in housing size, employment, and social class, the neighborhood was also a diverse mix of "native" whites, white immigrants from other states, established and prosperous German and Irish immigrants, newer and poorer German and Irish immigrants, and free blacks.

Otterbein experienced a new wave of immigration in the late nineteenth and early-twentieth centuries by immigrants from Italy, Greece, Russia, and Poland. A Catholic church on Lee St. and an affiliated school on Hill St. helped serve many of these immigrants. The housing stock and overall affluence of the neighborhood declined throughout this period as wealthier families moved into larger homes in newly established neighborhoods farther away from downtown Baltimore.

The final stage in this decline began during World War II, as a need for war housing led the owners of Otterbein homes to split up the individual rowhouses into many apartments, leading to overcrowding, poor sanitation, architectural sloppiness, and deteriorating physical conditions. After the war ended, few workers remained in this inner-city slum but rather moved to the suburbs, while property owners did not reinvest nor reverse the earlier shift to apartments. Alley homes and backyard shacks especially deteriorated, while the factories, shipping, and shipbuilding industries which had supplied most of the area jobs largely left the area, leaving the Inner Harbor a desolate expanse of rotting piers, empty warehouses, and sunken ships.

The neighborhood was seized by the government during the early 1970s and emptied of its residents, churches, and other institutions in preparation for the building of Interstate 95 and Interstate 70 through downtown Baltimore. The interstate would have destroyed the historic neighborhoods of Otterbein, Federal Hill, Highlandtown and Fell's Point. While Otterbein was successfully taken by the government, residents of Federal Hill and Fell's Point organized a very powerful grassroots coalition that succeeded in re-routing the interstate to a more southern route and saving all three neighborhoods. This effort was led in part by Highlandtown resident Barbara Mikulski, who used her success and prominence in this fight to launch her political career.

The changed path of Interstate 95 left the government in possession of hundreds of badly-deteriorated rowhouses in Otterbein. After starting to tear them down, the City of Baltimore decided to keep the remaining houses intact and inaugurate the largest urban homesteading program in the history of the United States. All of the existing original neighborhood houses were restored in the 1970s as a part of Baltimore's "dollar homes" urban homesteading program. After the success of this homesteading project in Otterbein was assured, the city allowed for the development of new townhomes and condominiums around the existing core of historic homes.

References

Artslife - Otterbein;  profile article; Baltimore Sun.

External links
The Otterbein Community Association
Otterbein on LiveBaltimore.com

 
Baltimore National Heritage Area
German-American culture in Baltimore
Historic districts in Baltimore
Irish-American culture in Baltimore
Neighborhoods in Baltimore